Dorothy Jones may refer to:
Dori Jones Yang, birth name Dorothy E. Jones (born 1954), American expert on China
Dorothy Janis, stage name of Dorothy Penelope Jones (1912–2010), American actress
Dorothy Jones (died 2010), American R&B singer in The Cookies
Dorothy Jones (diec ), early settler in New England, married Richard Sears (pilgrim)
Dorothy Jones, American founder of Jones' Fantastic Museum
Dorothy J. Heydt, American science fiction and fantasy author
Dorothy Swanda Jones (1929–1993), American politician
Dot-Marie Jones, full name Dorothy-Marie Jones (born 1964), American actress and athlete
Nida Blanca, stage name of Dorothy Acueza Jones (1936–2001), Filipina actress